The rivière du Moulin (in English: river of the Mill) is a tributary of the west bank of the Chaudière River which flows northward to empty onto the south bank of the St. Lawrence River. It flows in the municipalities of Saint-Alfred and Beauceville, in the Robert-Cliche Regional County Municipality, in the administrative region of Chaudière-Appalaches, in Quebec, in Canada.

Geography 
The main neighboring watersheds of the Moulin river are:
 North side: ruisseau des Meules, Mathieu River, Bras Saint-Victor, Chaudière River;
 east side: Chaudière River;
 south side: Victor-Loubier branch, Fabrique stream, Pozer River;
 west side: Bras Saint-Victor, rivière des Hamel, Prévost-Gilbert River.

The Moulin river has its source at Volet lake (altitude: 265) which is located in rang Saint-Guillaume de Saint-Alfred.

Lake Volet is fed by the Bernard stream (coming from the east) and the "discharge of Lake Fortin" (coming from the southwest).

From its source, the Moulin river flows over  divided into the following segments:
  northward, delimiting rang Saint-Guillaume (west side) and rang Clark (east side), to the confluence of the Noire River;
  northeasterly, up to the municipal limit between Saint-Alfred and Beauceville;
  northward, to the confluence of ruisseau des Meules;
  towards the northeast, crossing avenue Lambert which runs along the west bank of the Chaudière River, up to its confluence.

The Moulin river flows on the west bank of the Chaudière River in the municipality of Beauceville.

Toponymy 
The toponym Rivière du Moulin was made official on December 5, 1968, at the Commission de toponymie du Québec.

See also 

 List of rivers of Quebec

References 

Rivers of Chaudière-Appalaches
Beauce-Centre Regional County Municipality